Özgür Yılmaz may refer to:

 Özgür Yılmaz (footballer) (born 1986), Turkish footballer
 Özgür Yılmaz (judoka) (born 1977), Turkish judoka
 Özgür Yılmaz (Wind Engineer) (born 1979), TPI Composites, Pearce Renewables, Avangrid Renewables